Heinz Artur Raether (14 October 1909 — 31 December 1986) was a German physicist. He is best known for his theoretical and experimental contributions to the study of surface plasmons, as well as for Kretschmann-Raether configuration, a commonly-used experimental setup for the excitation of surface plasmon resonances.

From 1944 to 1946 he was a professor of physics at the University of Jena at the Physikalisches Institut. Here he dealt with electron physics, electron microscopy, electron interference and gas discharges.

In 1951, he took over the management of the Institute for Applied Physics at the University of Hamburg. After the development of the transistor, he focused on solid state physics. His work during this period concerned the structure and growth of crystals. Later he became interested in the collective behavior of the electrons of a crystal, the solid-state electron plasma.

In gas discharge physics, he devoted himself to the ignition process, especially the formation of the spark channel, the initial phase of electrical breakdown. In 1963 he was elected a full member of the Göttingen Academy of Sciences.  In 1979 he was elected a member of the Academy of Sciences Leopoldina.

Selected publications
Articles

Books

See also
Raether limit
Surface plasmon polariton
Townsend discharge

References

1909 births
1986 deaths
Condensed matter physicists
Electrical breakdown
Optical physicists
People associated with electricity
Scientists from Nuremberg
German plasma physicists
Plasmonics
Academic staff of the University of Hamburg
Academic staff of the University of Jena
20th-century German physicists
Nanophysicists